Princess Léa of Belgium (born Léa Inga Dora Wolman; 2 December 1951) is the widow of Prince Alexandre of Belgium. She is an aunt by marriage of King Philippe of Belgium.

Early life
She was born on 2 December 1951 as the daughter of Sigismund Wolman (born in Warsaw on 12 July 1906), a merchant in Brussels, and Lisa Bornstein (born in Germany).

Marriages and issue
She married Russian aristocrat Serge Victorovich Spetschinsky on 27 May 1975 in Brussels (son of Victor Sergeyevich Spetschinsky, President of the Russian Nobility Association in Belgium, and Elena Dmitrievna Guebel), from whom she was divorced on 28 March 1980. They had a daughter, Laetitia Spetschinsky (born in 1976), who is now married to HE Didier Nagant de Deuxchaisnes, Ambassador of Belgium to Ethiopia, and mother of two sons, Charles-Albert (b. 2009) and Alexandre (b. 2013), and a daughter Louise (b. 2010).

On 23 July 1983, she married Paul Robert Bichara in Uccle, and they had a son, Renaud Bichara, on 1 September 1983.

After her second divorce on 25 August 1987, she wed Prince Alexander in Debenham, Suffolk, on 14 March 1991. They had been introduced in 1986 by former defence minister Léon Mundeleer. Alexander asked her to accompany him to the cinema. She vacillated initially, but they began to enjoy dining out together, Alexander being a gourmand, according to his future wife.

The couple had no children together, and the marriage was kept secret until 1998, as reportedly the prince feared his mother would disapprove. Alexander's marriage contravened Article 85 of the Belgian constitution, which deprives of the right of succession to the throne any descendant of King Leopold I who marries without the sovereign's permission.

Published work
In 2008, she published a book of photographs from the life of her husband and his family, titled Le Prince Alexandre de Belgique, because she felt that he was too little known in Belgium.

Notes

Sources
 

1951 births
Living people
Belgian princesses
Belgian people of German descent
Princesses of Saxe-Coburg and Gotha
People from Etterbeek
House of Saxe-Coburg and Gotha (Belgium)
Belgian people of Polish descent